Cresera annulata is a moth of the family Erebidae first described by William Schaus in 1894. It is found in Brazil, Bolivia, Costa Rica and Panama.

References

Moths described in 1894
Phaegopterina